The 2008 Women's Pan-American Volleyball Cup was the seventh edition of the annual women's volleyball tournament, played by twelve countries from May 30 to June 7, 2008, in Mexicali and Tijuana, Mexico. The intercontinental event served as a qualifier for the 2009 FIVB World Grand Prix in Tokyo, Japan.

Competing Nations

Squads

Preliminary round

Group A

Friday May 30, 2008

Saturday May 31, 2008

Sunday June 1, 2008

Monday June 2, 2008

Tuesday June 3, 2008

Group B

Friday May 30, 2008

Saturday May 31, 2008

Sunday June 1, 2008

Monday June 2, 2008

Tuesday June 3, 2008

Final round

Classification 11–12
Thursday June 5, 2008

Classification 1/8 Finals
Thursday June 5, 2008

Quarterfinals
Thursday June 5, 2008

Classification 9–10
Friday June 6, 2008

Classification 5–8
Friday June 6, 2008

Semifinals
Friday June 6, 2008

Classification 7–8, 5–6
Saturday June 7, 2008

Finals
Saturday June 7, 2008

Final ranking

Dominican Republic, Brazil, Puerto Rico and the United States qualified for the 2009 World Grand Prix

Individual awards

Most Valuable Player

Best Scorer

Best Spiker

Best Blocker

Best Server

Best Digger

Best Setter

Best Receiver

Best Libero

Rising Star

References
 results
 FIVB

Women's Pan-American Volleyball Cup
Pan-American Volleyball Cup
V
Women's Pan-American Volleyball Cup
International volleyball competitions hosted by Mexico
2008 in Mexican women's sports